Brickell is a neighborhood in Miami, Florida located directly east of Interstate 95, south of the historic CBD, and north of Coconut Grove. Brickell is known as the financial district in Miami, as well as South Florida.

Brickell was founded in the mid-19th century, growing to become Miami's "Millionaire's Row" in the early 20th century after the construction of lavish mansions along Brickell Avenue by Mary Brickell; both the avenue and neighborhood were named for Ms. Brickell and her husband, William Brickell. By the 1970s, office towers, hotels and apartments began replacing the historic mansions. Brickell overtook the city's central business district to the north, as one of the largest financial districts in the United States. With a fast-growing residential population, Brickell is Miami's most dense neighborhood, with a 2010 population of about 31,000.

Media
Brickell Magazine is a magazine covering Brickell and Downtown Miami. Launched in 2008, it is published by TAG Media, Inc. Jorge Arauz is the editor-in-chief.

Background
Brickell is a dense, high-rise residential neighborhood with many upscale, luxury condominium and apartment towers.  Brickell Avenue, Brickell's main north–south avenue and along with Miami Avenue, is home to many popular Miami restaurants, shops, art galleries, and places of entertainment. A few hundred feet east of the northeastern side of Brickell is Brickell Key, an island of high-rise residential and hotel towers, including the Mandarin Oriental. , over 190,000 office employees work in greater Downtown. Today, greater Downtown Miami is one of the fastest-growing neighborhoods in Miami, booming from 40,000 residents in 2000 to 80,000 in 2010. Brickell is served by the Miami Metrorail at the Brickell station and by 5 stations of the Metromover's Brickell Loop.

Banking and consulates
As South Florida's financial district, Brickell is the core of Miami's banking, investment, and financial sectors. Additionally, along with Downtown Miami, Brickell has most of the state's foreign consulates, including the consulates of Argentina, Brazil, Chile, Dominican Republic, Ecuador, France, Guatemala, Japan, Mexico, the Netherlands, Peru, Switzerland, Trinidad and Tobago, and the United Kingdom, amongst others.

Geography

Brickell lies immediately east of Interstate 95, including Southwest 3rd Avenue, and extends to the Biscayne Bay. Brickell extends north to the Miami River and south to SW 26th Road (the Rickenbacker Causeway). The neighborhood comprises mostly financial and residential buildings north of Broadway (Southwest 15th Road), and mostly residential buildings south of Broadway.  Brickell is home to 31,759 year-round residents. 

Although Brickell was known as a financial district, in recent years, construction of numerous residential and mixed-use towers has reshaped the neighborhood into a residential community. Brickell now offers residents a walkable lifestyle, where work and entertainment converge. Ongoing development has expanded the dense urban core of Brickell from Brickell Avenue west to Interstate I95, making the Metrorail line and new and expanding Underline Park the center of the neighborhood. As of 2010, 80,000 residents live in Brickell, among them, famous celebrities such as José José, Luis Miguel, Clinton Portis, Jennifer Lopez and Marc Anthony.

Within Brickell is Mary Brickell Village, which was the center of the neighborhood’s entertainment district when it opened in 2006. It remains to be a popular gathering spot that includes  restaurants, boutique retail shops, and a variety of service providers. The project design was inspired by a mediterranean-style village with open squares that facilitate social gatherings and entertainment events. It’s design now contrasts to the steel Manhattan-like skyscrapers that surround it, but offers a welcoming scale more akin to coastal Mediterranean villages in Europe. Plans are in place to redevelop a portion of this space.

To the north of Brickell is Downtown, with most of the area's public elementary schools and Miami Dade College's Wolfson Campus. Downtown is also home to the Miami Main Library, as well as various parks, theatres, museums, and sporting venues. South of Brickell is Coconut Grove, with Mercy Hospital, CocoWalk, Dinner Key, Villa Vizcaya, as well as many historic sites and parks. Coconut Grove also has many of Miami's best private schools, such as Ransom Everglades, Carrollton School of the Sacred Heart, and Immaculata-Lasalle High School.

West of Brickell is Little Havana, extending from Interstate I95 westward. East of Brickell is Biscayne Bay, and eastward along the Rickenbacker Causeway, is Virginia Key and Key Biscayne. Both keys have many public beaches, nature preserves, parks, and various other cultural venues. Also east, along the MacArthur Causeway is South Beach.

Demographics

As of 2010, the population of Brickell had 27,776 people, with a population density of 37,622 per square mile, making it one of the densest neighborhoods in the United States. In the 2010 US Census, the racial makeup of Brickell was 62.0% Hispanic of any race, 33.2% White (non-Hispanic), 1.6% Asian, and 1.4% Black. The zip codes for Brickell include 33129, 33130, and 33131. Many of its daily occupants work in banking, law, and finance.

As of 2000, there were 5,557 males and 5,972 females. The median age for males was 38.4 years old, while the median age for females was 40.6 years old. The average household size had 1.8 people, while the average family size had 2.6 members. The percentage of married-couple families (among all households) was 30.3%, while the percentage of married-couple families with children (among all households) was 8.5%, and the percentage of single-mother households (among all households) was 4.3%. The percentage of never-married males 15 years old and over was 20.2%, while the percentage of never-married females 15 years old and over was 16.0%.

As of 2000, the percentage of people who speak English not well or not at all made up 27.7% of the population. The percentage of residents born in Florida was 17.1%, the percentage of people born in another U.S. state was 13.7%, and the percentage of native residents but born outside the U.S. was 3.9%, while the percentage of foreign-born residents was 65.3%.

Brickell is a highly educated and affluent neighborhood. As of 2014, an estimated 75% of residents older than 25 hold at least a bachelors level degree with 34% holding an advanced degree. The approximate average household income of $125,500 is more than twice the average for the City of Miami.

Education and institutions

Elementary schools
Miami-Dade County Public Schools operates area public schools:
Southside Elementary School

Private schools:
First Presbyterian International Christian School (Christian)
Gordon Day School (Jewish)
Prima Casa Montessori School

Colleges and universities
Florida International University (Downtown Campus), a public university
University of Miami, a private research university in neighboring Coral Gables

Libraries
Miami Main Library

Places of worship
Places of worship in the Brickell neighborhood include:
First Presbyterian Church of Miami
Crossbridge Church in Brickell
St. Jude Melkite Catholic Church
The Rok Family Shul: Chabad Downtown Jewish Center
Beth David Congregation

Transportation

Brickell is served by Metrobus throughout the area, the Miami Metrorail, and the Metromover:

Metrorail:
  Brickell (SW 11th Street and 1st Avenue)

Metromover:
 Brickell Loop

Public Transportation in the Downtown/Brickell area is used more than in any other part of Miami and is a vital part of Brickell's life. Metrorail, Miami's heavy rail system, has one station in Brickell at the Brickell Station. In addition to Metrorail, the Metromover train system runs 3 lines throughout Downtown (the Downtown Loop, the Omni Loop, and the Brickell Loop). The Metromover connects with Metrorail and is free. Metromover stations can be found at roughly every two blocks in Brickell.

Metrorail has stops throughout Miami with connections to Miami International Airport, all Miami-Dade County bus lines, Tri-Rail and Amtrak. The main bus station in Downtown is located next to the Arsht Center at the Adrienne Arsht Center Station. Plans are in place to connect the Metrorail to Midtown and South Beach.

As an urban and pedestrian-friendly area with an extensive public transit network, Brickell (along with Downtown, Omni, and South Beach) is one of the areas in Miami where a car-free lifestyle is commonplace. Many Brickellites get around by foot, bicycle, scooter, Metromover, taxi, or ride share app. The Metromover is a popular alternative to walking in the area, especially on rainy, hot or cold days, as the Metromover is free, and stations are located roughly every two blocks throughout the area.

Recently, the City of Miami, along with the Downtown Development Authority, has begun bicycle initiatives promoting citywide bike parking and bike lanes, which have made bicycling much more popular for residents. Bike lanes and bike sharrows are currently planned for the majority of Downtown streets to be painted by the end of 2010. Decobike, the popular bike-sharing program in Miami Beach, has announced a launch in Brickell/Downtown Miami in mid-2014. The Venetian Causeway is a popular bicycle commuter route that connects South Beach to Downtown. The Rickenbacker Causeway is very popular on weekends for recreational bicyclists, and often, bicycles can outnumber cars on the causeway.

Taxis and Ride Share Services
Taxis and ride share services, like Uber and Alto, are popular in Brickell, especially from Brickell to South Beach, Design District or to Coconut Grove. Since many Brickell residents choose to not have cars, taxis and ride share services are also popular for rides within Downtown neighborhoods, especially after midnight when the Metromover stops running. Taxis can be hailed on the street or telephoned, and ride sharing services can be ordered using mobile apps.

Brickell skyscrapers

Office towers
Brickell World Plaza
Colonnade Plaza
Four Seasons Hotel Miami
1450 Brickell
Brickell Arch
Sabadell Financial Center
Brickell Financial Centre
701 Brickell Avenue
Colonnade Plaza
 Brickell Bay Office Tower
Latitude One International Business Center
Brickell Bayview Center
Brickell City Tower
830 Brickell

Residential towers
 Brickell Ten
500 Brickell West Tower
500 Brickell East Tower
Brickell House
Asia
Jade at Brickell Bay
Emerald at Brickell
Costa Bella
The Courts
The Mark on Brickell
The Four Ambassadors
Santa Maria
Plaza on Brickell North Tower
Plaza on Brickell South Tower
Axis at Brickell North Tower
Axis at Brickell South Tower
The Fortune House Hotel - Hotel and condos
Four Seasons - Hotel and condos
Skyline
Brickell Mar
Brickell Place Phase I
Brickell Place Phase II
Brickell View West
Brickell on the River North Tower
Brickell on the River South Tower
Avenue on Brickell East Tower
Avenue on Brickell West Tower
Latitude on the River
The Palace
Atlantis Condominium
Solitair Brickell
Panorama
Rise
Reach
One Broadway
One Tequesta Point
Carbonell Condominium
The Club at Brickell Bay
Infinity at Brickell
Icon Brickell North Tower
Icon Brickell South Tower
Viceroy Tower
The Sail
Neo Vertika
Two Tequesta Point
Three Tequesta Point
Villa Regina
Vue at Brickell
The Yacht Club
 Brickell Heights - West Tower
 Brickell Heights - East Tower
 SLS Lux
 1100 Millecento
 1060 Brickell (previously Avenue on Brickell East Tower)
 1050 Brickell (previously Avenue on Brickell West Tower)
 The Bond on Brickell

Parks

Simpson Park Hammock- (nature preserve) S. Miami Ave and Broadway
Alice Wainwright Park- (nature preserve) Brickell Ave and the Rickenbacker Causeway
Southside Park- SW 1st Ave and SW 11th St
Allen Morris Brickell Park- SE 10th St and SE 1st Ave
Brickell Park- Brickell Ave and SE 5th St
Miami Circle- Brickell Avenue Bridge (next to Icon Brickell towers)
Brickell Key Park- 805 Claughton Island Dr

Historic Brickell

With rapid urbanization over the decades, very little remains of the original character of Brickell. Brickell was originally platted for mansions and large homes by Mary Brickell, which thus led to the name "Millionaire's Row."  With the growth of the city, especially in the 1970s onwards, Brickell's character began to change with the construction of high-rise office towers along Brickell Avenue, and high-rise residential towers in lower Brickell, south of SE 15th Road (Broadway). A commercial boom in the 1980s brought mass construction of office towers to Brickell, and subsequent construction, would further change the neighborhood into the dense, urban, residential and commercial neighborhood it is today. Some of the historic buildings remaining in Brickell can be seen in the photos below. While not a registered historic landmark, Brickell is home to Tobacco Road, which claimed to be Miami's oldest bar, in business since 1912, with a now-demolished building built in 1915.

Gallery

See also
List of tallest buildings in Miami
Brickell Avenue
Downtown Miami
Miami Circle

References

External links

Economy of Miami
Financial districts in the United States
Neighborhoods in Miami
Populated places on the Intracoastal Waterway in Florida